David Bles (1821, The Hague – 1899, The Hague), was a 19th-century painter from the Northern Netherlands.

Biography
According to the Netherlands Institute for Art History, at the age of thirteen Bles was talented enough to be accepted at the Hague Academy. He attended classes from 1834 to 1837 and from 1838 to 1841. He became a pupil of the painter Cornelis Kruseman and his nephew Jan Adam Kruseman. Bles then travelled to France to study with Joseph-Nicolas Robert-Fleury in Paris.  He remained in Paris until 1843 after which he settled in The Hague, though he was a member of the Royal Academy in Amsterdam between 1845 and 1899. He painted scenes from the history of Dutch painting and is best known for portraits and genre paintings.

References

External link
 
David Bles on Artnet

1821 births
1899 deaths
19th-century Dutch painters
Dutch male painters
Artists from The Hague
19th-century Dutch male artists